Ye Peng (sometimes also transliterated Ye Feng, 1897–1947) was a Chinese lieutenant general who fought for the Republic of China and later became a key figure in the Nanjing Nationalist Government of Wang Jingwei.

Biography 
Ye Peng entered the Baoding Military Academy in 1917 and graduated in 1919 from its artillery department. He rose through the ranks of the National Revolutionary Army during the 1930s, holding various military posts. In 1939 he joined Wang Jingwei and his pro-peace faction, being appointed to the Kuomintang central committee under his Reorganized National Government of China. Ye became the head of a training center in Shanghai and was a member of the Central Military Commission. In 1941 he was appointed to command the 29th Army. In June 1942, he replaced Yang Kuiyi as Chief of General Staff. In April 1943, he became head of the Minister of Military Affairs. In 1945 Ye became governor of the Hubei Province. After the defeat of Japan in August of that year, he served under Chiang Kai-shek again briefly, commanding the 7th Army. On September 18, however, he was executed in Nanjing for the crime of hanjian.

Alma mater 

Baoding Military Academy

Sources

Literature 
 Xu, Youchun. Dictionary of the People of the Republic (民国人物大辞典 増訂版). Hebei People's Publishing House, 2007. .
 Liu, Shou. Official Chronology of the Republic of China (民国職官年表). Zhonghua Book Company, 1995. .

1897 births
1947 deaths
Baoding Military Academy alumni
Executed Chinese collaborators with Imperial Japan
Kuomintang collaborators with Imperial Japan
National Revolutionary Army generals